Ascended masters in the Ascended Master Teachings of a number of movements in the theosophical tradition are held to be spiritually enlightened beings who in past incarnations were ordinary humans, but who have undergone a series of spiritual transformations originally called initiations.

Both "mahatma" and "ascended master" are terms used in the Ascended Master Teachings. Ascended Master is based on the theosophical concept of the Mahatma or Masters of the Ancient Wisdom. However, Mahatmas and Ascended Masters are believed by some to differ in certain respects.

According to the Ascended Master Teachings a "Master of Light", "Healer" or "Spiritual Master" is a Divine Human Being who has taken the Fifth Initiation and is thereby capable of dwelling in a 5th dimension. The teachings hold that an "ascended master" is a human being who has taken the Sixth Initiation, also referred to as Ascension, and is thereby believed to be capable of dwelling in a 6th dimension.

The term "ascended master" was first used by Baird T. Spalding in 1924 in his series of books, Life and Teachings of the Masters of the Far East (DeVorss and Co.). Godfre Ray King (Guy Ballard) further popularized this concept of spiritual masters who had once lived on the earth in his book Unveiled Mysteries.

Definition
Adherents of the Ascended Master Teachings hold that this belief was partially released by the Theosophical Society beginning in 1875, by C.W. Leadbeater and Alice A. Bailey, and began to have more detailed public release in the 1930s by the ascended masters through Guy Ballard in the I AM Activity. However, theosophists maintain that the concept of ascended master is an exaggeration and corruption of the more modest theosophical concept of "Master of the Ancient Wisdom".

Guy Ballard said his work Unveiled Mysteries was dictated to him by the ascended master St. Germain. Other Ascended Master Teachings are contained in The Bridge to Freedom (1951), Mark Prophet and Elizabeth Clare Prophet's The Summit Lighthouse (1958) (reorganized as the  Church Universal and Triumphant in 1975), The Temple of The Presence (1995), The Hearts Center (2005), the I AM University (2004), and various other organizations such as The White Eagle Lodge (1936) and the Aquarian Christine Church Universal (2006).

Peter Mt. Shasta, who claims to be channeling the ascended master Saint Germain, has been releasing the ancient teachings in a more modern and simplified form, emphasizing the teaching that the Masters can work with those who have an open heart and the desire to benefit humanity.

Beliefs about ascended masters

The term Ascended Master was first introduced in 1934 by Guy Ballard with the publication of Unveiled Mysteries, a book which he said was dictated to him by the Ascended Master: St. Germain. Other Ascended Master Teachings are contained in The Bridge to Freedom (1951), The Summit Lighthouse (1958), (Known also as The Church Universal and Triumphant<ref name="Lewis, James R. 1942">{{cite book |last= Melton |first= J. Gordon |author-link= |date=1994 |title=Church Universal and Triumphant in Scholarly Perspective |url= https://archive.org/details/churchuniversalt0000unse |location= |publisher= Stanford, Calif. : Center for Academic Publication |pages=1–2 |isbn=978-0-8191-9634-7}}</ref> The Aetherius Society (1955), The Temple of The Presence (1995), the I AM University (2004), the White Eagle Lodge (1936) and the Aquarian Christine Church Universal, Inc. (2006).Watson, Jacob L. "Initiations of the Aquarian Masters: The Theosophy of the Aquarian Gospel" Outskirts Press 2009 

It is believed that Ascended Masters are individuals who were formerly embodied on the Earth and learned the lessons of life during their incarnations. They gained mastery over the limitations of the matter planes, balanced at least 51% of negative karma, and fulfilled their Dharma (divine plan). An Ascended Master, in such an understanding, has become God-like and a source of unconditional "Divine Love" to all life, and through the Ascension has united with his or her own "God Self," the "I AM Presence."

It is further claimed by various groups and teachers that the Ascended Masters serve as the teachers of mankind from the realms of spirit, and that all people will eventually attain their Ascension and move forward in spiritual evolution beyond this planet. According to these teachings, they remain attentive to the spiritual needs of humanity and act to inspire and motivate its spiritual growth. In many traditions and organizations, they are considered part of the Spiritual Hierarchy of Earth, and members of the Great Brotherhood of Light, also known as the Great White Lodge, Great White Brotherhood, or Universal White Brotherhood (per Peter Deunov).

Elizabeth Clare Prophet claimed, by taking "dictations" from them, names of many dozens of additional Ascended Masters that were previously unknown.

The concept of recognizing the spiritual self, one's own psychological and karma battles and how to overcome them, and eventual Ascension of all humanity is covered in James Redfield's Celestine Prophecy and its sequels, The Tenth Insight: Holding the Vision and The Secret of Shambhala: In Search of the Eleventh Insight.  These books, while controversial, are recent popularizations of the concept of Ascension.

In Ascended Master teachings there is also mention of Serapis Bey, a being who was incarnated as a high priest in one of the "Temples of the Sacred Fire" on Atlantis, and who migrated to Egypt at the time of the destruction of Atlantis. It is also believed that he was incarnated as the Egyptian Pharaoh Amenhotep III (who constructed the Temple of Luxor to the god Amon) and also as Leonidas, the King of Sparta, who was killed in 480 BC defending the pass of Thermopylae against the invasion of ancient Greece by Emperor Xerxes I of the Persian Empire. According to teachings of Agni Yoga,

Universal All-Pervading Presence of Life
This is properly called Isness; students of the Ascended Master Teachings believe that there is One God, the "Universal All-Pervading Presence of Life", "The One", Who is the Source of all Love, Light, and Truth in existence, and that all forms of existence and consciousness emanate from this "Allness of God"—"The One". The Voice of the I AM states "All Life is One"  and that there is "One Substance, One Energy, One Power, One Intelligence" as the Source of all consciousness and creation. This Divine Being and Mind is considered to be above and distinct from all creation (in the sense of classical theism), transcending all creation yet interpenetrating all existence. Belief in this "One God" stresses the essential unity of the spiritual and material components of the universe. God creates through Individualized Identities that have distinct Self-Consciousness and that make up the Spiritual Hierarchy of Creation, yet remain connected through the flow of the "River of Life" and "Lifestream" to the "One Undivided God" - the "All in All" - the "Good" - the "Source from which all Life, Light, and Love come." There is always an uninterrupted "Oneness" that is maintained with the "Allness" of God. From the "One God" all other realities, including hierarchy, humanity and the material universe, are the result of a process of emanation.

The Individualized "I AM" Presence
Adherents of the Ascended Master Teachings believe that each person is an incarnation of an "Individualized Presence" of the "Most High Living God" - the "Mighty I AM Presence" - as part of our very Nature and Being. God (as Life and Love) manifests in the 7 octaves of the created universe through individual Divine Identities. As embodied individuals, we are the outer expression of that God Self in form. It is our unique and immortal True Identity, yet always sharing in the Allness of the ONE GOD.

A characteristic of students of the Ascended Master Teachings is the use of God's Creative Name - "I AM" - in the use of Decrees, Fiats, Adorations, and Affirmations to invoke and send forth the Light of God to Bless Life, to bring forth the Perfect Divine solution for every situation, and to fulfill the Divine Plan. It is believed to be a way of externalizing more Divine Light, Divine Love, and Divine Life into the lower planes of creation through the dynamic force of sound vibration as creative energy.The Magic Presence states:"Only the Self-conscious Individual has ALL the Attributes and Creative Power of the 'Mighty I AM Presence.' Only He can know who and what He is, and express the Fullness of the Creative Power of God whenever He decrees, by the use of the Words, 'I AM.' The outer human part of this activity is what We call the personality. It is but the vehicle through which Perfection should be expressed into the outer substance of the Universe.

"Within the 'Pure God-Flame' is a Breath that pulsates constantly. This `Great Fire-Breath' is a Rhythmic Outpouring of Divine Love, Its Three Attributes being 'Love, Wisdom, and Power in action.' These pour out constantly, into the 'Infinite Sea of Pure Electronic Light.' This Light is the Universal Substance or Spirit, out of which all forms are composed. It is intelligent, mark you, because It obeys law through the command of the Individual who says, or is conscious of, 'I AM.' These Two Words are the Acknowledgment and Release of the Power to Create and bring forth into outer existence, whatever quality follows That Acknowledgment. For Intelligence to act there must be Intelligence to be acted upon, and the Universal Substance, being like a photographic film, takes the record of what-ever quality the Individual imposes upon It through his thought, feeling, and spoken word. The Words 'I AM' whether thought, felt, or spoken, release the Power of Creation instantly. Make no mistake about this. Intelligence is Omnipresent, and It is within the Electronic Light."Ascended Master Saint Germain, believed by those adherent to the Ascended Master Teachings to have previously been embodied as Plato, Proclus, Roger Bacon, Francis Bacon, and numerous others, was quoted as saying:"When one individualizes within the Absolute, All-Pervading Life, he chooses of his own free will to become an intensified individual focus of Self-Conscious Intelligence. He is the conscious director of his future activities. Thus, having once made his choice, he is the only one who can fulfill that Destiny — which is not inflexible circumstance but a definitely designed Plan of Perfection." When You, the 'Mighty I AM Presence,' will to come forth into an Individualized Focus of Conscious Dominion and use the Creative Word, 'I AM,' Your First Individual Activity is the Formation of a Flame. Then you, the 'Individualized Focus' of the 'Mighty I AM Presence,' begin your Dynamic Expression of Life. This Activity, We term Self-consciousness, meaning the Individual who is conscious of his Source and Perfection of Life, expressing through himself."Within The "I AM" Activity, contact and cooperation with the Ascended Masters became a central part of each member's life. Through the Ballards as "Messengers", the Ascended Masters were believed to have regularly communicated with the students of The "I AM" Activity. Those Addresses (known as "Dictations") were delivered before gatherings of members in Conclaves held throughout the United States of America, published in the monthly periodical, The Voice of The "I AM", and some were collected and reprinted in the books of The Saint Germain Series. In all, 3,834 Dictations from the Masters were received through Guy and Edna Ballard. Other "Ascended Master Activities" believed that the Ascended Masters, Cosmic Beings, Elohim, and Archangels continued to present a program for both individual development and spiritual transformation in the world. They believe that further instruction from the Ascended Masters and the rest of the Spiritual Hierarchy continued through new Dispensations with new Messengers, such as The Bridge to Freedom, The Summit Lighthouse, The Temple of The Presence, and The Hearts Center.

The Threefold Flame of Life is the Immortal Flame within the Heart of the children of Light and Sons and Daughters of God, and is an actual extension of the Heart of the I AM Presence of each Lifestream in embodiment on Earth.

Other beliefs about Ascended Masters
Belief in the Brotherhood and the Masters is an essential part of the beliefs of various organizations that have continued and expanded the concepts released in the original Saint Germain instruction in the 1930s through The "I AM" Activity.Schroeder, Werner Ascended Masters and Their Retreats Ascended Master Teaching Foundation 2004, Listing of those who are believed to be Ascended Masters by The I AM Activity and The Bridge to FreedomBooth, Annice The Masters and Their Retreats, Summit Lighthouse Library June 2003, Listing of those who are believed to be Ascended Masters by The I AM Activity, The Bridge to Freedom, and The Summit Lighthouse Examples of those believed by the ones proposing these teachings to be Ascended Masters would be the Master Jesus, Confucius, Gautama Buddha, Mary the Mother of Jesus, St. Paul of Tarsus (aka Hilarion), Megha Alcorn also known as Miss Megan Sebastian, Ashtar Sheran, Merku, Sanat Kumara, Aaron as known as Alaje, Aleph, Hatton,  Melchizedek, Archangel Michael, Metatron, Kwan Yin, St. Germain and Kuthumi, as well as dozens of others.

It is believed that Ascended Masters are individuals who were once embodied on Earth and learned the lessons of life in their incarnations. They gained mastery over the limitations of the matter planes, balanced at least 51% of negative karma, and fulfilled their Dharma (Divine Plan). An Ascended Master has become God-like and a source of unconditional Love to all life, and through the Ascension has united with his or her own God Self, the "I AM" Presence. It is claimed that they serve as the teachers of mankind from the realms of Spirit, and that all people will eventually attain their Ascension and move forward in spiritual evolution beyond this planet. According to these teachings, they remain attentive to the spiritual needs of humanity, and act to inspire and motivate its spiritual growth. In many traditions and organizations, they are considered part of the Spiritual Hierarchy for Earth, and members of the Great Brotherhood of Light, also known as the Great White Lodge or Great White Brotherhood.Unveiled Mysteries says:"Truly the Great Ascended Masters are Gods. It is no wonder in the mythology of the ancients that their activities have been brought down to us in the guise of myth and fable. They wield Tremendous God Power at all times because they hold with unwavering determination to the Great God Presence and hence all Power is given unto them for they are All-Perfection. "'When Jesus said, All these things I have done, ye shall do and even greater things shall ye do, he knew whereof he spoke,' continued Saint Germain. 'He came forth to reveal the Conscious Dominion and Mastery that it is possible for every human being to attain and express while still here on Earth."

 Spiritual hierarchy 
Adherents of these Ascended Master Teachings believe that the All-Pervading Presence of God does not act nor create except through Its Individualizations and that all creation comes forth through these Individual Identities and is sustained by them. According to Elizabeth Clare Prophet, this Spiritual Hierarchy is a "Universal Chain" of Individualized God Free Beings fulfilling Attributes and Aspects of God's Infinite Selfhood. Included in this Cosmic Hierarchical scheme are Solar Logoi, Elohim, Sons and Daughters of God, Ascended Masters, Cosmic Beings, the Twelve Solar Hierarchies, Archangels, Angels, Beings of the Elements, and Twin Flames of the Alpha-Omega Polarity sponsoring Systems of Worlds and entire Galactic Systems.

Adherents believe that Saint Germain explained the following through Guy Ballard:"The 'Almighty God Flame,' breathing within Itself, projects Two Rays into the 'Great Sea of Pure Electronic Light.' This Intelligent Light-substance becomes the clothing, as it were, for these Rays of the 'Mighty I AM Presence.' Each Ray has all the Attributes of the Godhead within It, and no imperfection can ever enter into or register upon It. The Individualized Flame sends down into each Ray a Focal Point, or Spark, forming a Heart Center upon which gathers the 'Electronic Light Substance,' creating the Electronic Body."In 1937, The Voice of the I AM article on this subject elaborated:"When the Ascension of both has taken place, each is the complete balance of all masculine and all feminine qualities within himself. Then the Threefold Flame of Life is completely unfolded, the individual becomes Master at Cosmic Levels of creation and does work with systems of worlds, as well as in this physical world. Thus, that which came out of the Great Central Sun as One Flame becomes Three complete Flames, each of the same full Limitless Power and Activity as the Great Central Sun. This becomes the Cosmic Activity of the Power of the 'Three times Three'. "When both Rays have made the Ascension, then the individual works with systems of worlds instead of just in one world. This is the way the Godhead is ever expanding the Perfection of Itself throughout Infinity and keeping order throughout interstellar space."Use of the "Violet Flame of Divine Love" is considered to be the 7th Ray aspect of the Holy Spirit and the "Sacred Fire" that transmutes and consumes the "cause, effect, record, and memory" of sin or negative karma. Also called the "Flame of Transmutation", the "Flame of Mercy", the "Flame of Freedom", and the "Flame of Forgiveness". "Our God is a Consuming Fire" in Deuteronomy 4:24 (KJV) and Hebrews 12:29 (KJV) is believed to be refer to this "Sacred Fire of God".

The "Violet Fire" is held to be a raising, transforming, purifying action of "Divine Love" from the "Heart of God" in the "Great Central Sun". It is believed to act to transmute and consume human creation that is not worthy of becoming Immortal, and all negative karmic causes, effects, records, and memories, without the need to individually balance that karma face-to-face with each person back to the earliest beginning of one's individualized manifestation on this or any other world.

Jesus

Jesus is believed to be one of the Masters of the Ancient Wisdom in Theosophy and is one of the Ascended masters in the Ascended Master Teachings. The Master Jesus is regarded by Theosophists, was regarded by Alice Bailey and was later regarded by students of the "Ascended Master Teachings" as the Master of the Sixth Ray.

It is believed by Ascended Master Teachings organizations that the Master Jesus was "Chohan of the Sixth Ray" until December 31, 1959, when, according to Elizabeth Clare Prophet, Lady Master Nada fully took on that Office in the Spiritual Hierarchy. According to Prophet, Jesus became World Teacher, along with Kuthumi, on January 1, 1956, succeeding Maitreya, who took the Office of "Planetary Buddha" and "Cosmic Christ".Prophet, Mark L. and Elizabeth Clare Lords of the Seven Rays Livingston, Montana: Summit University Press 1986 page 225 This belief is not accepted by adherents of traditional Theosophy and the followers of Alice Bailey and Benjamin Creme - they believe that the Master Jesus is still the Chohan of the Sixth Ray and that Maitreya is still the World Teacher.

According to Elizabeth Clare Prophet, the Prophet of the Church Universal and Triumphant, the largest Ascended Master Teachings religion, the Master Jesus incarnated twice as the Emperor of Atlantis, once in 33,050 BC and again in 15,000 BC. She states that this was to aid the white magicians in the war of the white magicians and the black magicians that was going on in Atlantis at that time.

According to Alice Bailey, the Master Jesus was previously incarnated as Joshua, the Hebrew military leader in the 13th century BC, and Joshua the High Priest in the sixth century BC.

According to the Ascended Master Teachings,Schroeder, Werner. Ascended Masters and Their Retreats, Ascended Master Teaching Foundation, 2004. Listing of those who are believed to be Ascended Masters by The I AM Activity and The Bridge to FreedomBooth, Annice. The Masters and Their Retreats  Summit Lighthouse Library, June 2003. Listing of those who are believed to be Ascended Masters by The I AM Activity, The Bridge to Freedom, and The Summit Lighthouse Jesus was also incarnated as Joseph of the Coat of many colors in the 17th century BC/16th century BC (approximately between 1650 BC and 1550 BC), as well as King David (who lived c. 1037 BC until around 970 BC), and Elisha in the 9th century BC.

Sanat Kumara

According to the post-1900 publications of Theosophy (specifically, the writings of Charles W. Leadbeater, Alice Bailey, and Benjamin Creme, as well as the Ascended Master Teachings of Guy Ballard, Elizabeth Clare Prophet, Geraldine Innocente, Joshua David Stone, and other Ascended Master Teachings teachers), Sanat KumaraA Progress Report On Our Ascension at luisprada.com is an "advanced being" of the Ninth Initiation (the highest Initiation possible on planet Earth) who is regarded as the Lord or Regent of Earth and of humanity, and the head of the Spiritual Hierarchy of Earth who dwells in Shamballah, a city said by Theosophists and those adherent to the Ascended Master Teachings to be a floating city on the etheric plane above the Gobi Desert.

It is believed by these authors that he is the founder of the Great White Brotherhood, which is composed of Masters of the Ancient Wisdom (Fifth Initiation), Ascended Masters (Sixth Initiation), Chohans and Bodhisattvas (Seventh Initiation), Buddhas (Eighth Initiation), and highly spiritually-evolved volunteers from other worlds, who have all joined to advance spiritual evolution on Earth.

Sanat Kumara was mentioned briefly  by the theosophist Helena Blavatsky. She claimed he belonged to a group of beings, the "Lords of the Flame", whom Christian tradition  have misunderstood as Lucifer and the fallen angels.

Sanat Kumara gained greater prominence when her follower Charles W. Leadbeater wrote that Sanat Kumara was the "King" or Lord of the World, and the head of the Great White Brotherhood of Mahatmas who had revealed the principles of theosophy.

Later theosophists such as Alice Bailey and Elizabeth Clare Prophet have embellished the story with further details. He is usually depicted as having the appearance of a 16-year-old boy.

Comparison with Masters of Wisdom
There is considerable difference between the concept of Masters of the Ancient Wisdom in Theosophy (as described by Blavatsky, Olcott, Sinnett, and others) and the current concept of Ascended Masters, developed by Guy Ballard and Elizabeth Clare Prophet fifty-five years after the Theosophical Society was founded.

They added more than 200 new "Ascended Masters" that they claimed to receive dictations from in addition to receiving dictations from the original Masters of the Ancient Wisdom of Theosophy.

The Ascended Masters, as their name suggests, are supposed to be Masters who have experienced the miracle of ascension, as it is said Jesus did. The original teaching, channeled by Guy Ballard, was that a new Ascended Master would not die but would take the body up with him. This teaching of ascension is in direct opposition to the Theosophical teachings. Mahatma K.H. refers to the idea disparagingly in one of his letters to Sinnett:

Blavatsky also rejects ascension as a fact, calling it "an allegory as old as the world." In the Theosophical view, the Masters of Wisdom retain their physical bodies.

The Masters of the Wisdom are not like the Ascended ones, who are said to become Godlike, all-powerful beings beyond the laws of nature. In their teachings, the Theosophical Masters even denied that such beings exist. Mahatma K.H. wrote:

In their letters, the Mahatmas constantly talk about the "immutable laws" of the universe, and that they can help humanity only within the limits of these laws.

Proponents of the Ascended Masters sometimes attempt to account for these discrepancies by claiming that when the Theosophical Society (TS) was founded most of the Theosophical Mahatmas were still "unascended Masters". This leaves room to detach the Ascended Masters from the limitations. However, the Mahatma K.H. wrote: "We are not infallible, all-foreseeing 'Mahatmas' at every hour of the day." As he explained: "An adept—the highest as the lowest—is one only during the exercise of his occult powers." In fact, according to the Theosophical teachings, the higher the adept, the less we are likely to hear from him:

In the Theosophical view the Masters do not pay attention to personal desires. Theosophy teaches that the psychological ego is false, that the idea that we are this body, emotions, and mind is a mistake of perception and the source of sorrow. It says that real happiness comes only as an unsought by-product of reducing rather than increasing our attachment and identification with the personal. Blavatsky wrote that "Occultism is not . . . the pursuit of happiness as man understands the word; for the first step is sacrifice, the second renunciation." K.H. agreed with this when he wrote: "We—the criticized and misunderstood Brothers—we seek to bring men to sacrifice their personality—a passing flash—for the welfare of the whole humanity." During the early times of the Theosophical Society, some members, misunderstanding the nature of the Mahatmas, would bring HPB some personal requests to ask of them. In a letter Blavatsky explained:

This kind of interest is a very marked feature of the Ascended Masters. The Ascended Masters Teachings teach ways to attract material or emotional possessions to a person's life, and also how to dissolve unpleasant karma, a conception that the Theosophical Mahatmas emphatically opposed. For example, K.H. wrote: "Bear in mind that the slightest cause produced, however unconsciously, and with whatever motive, cannot be unmade, or its effects crossed in their progress—by millions of gods, demons, and men combined." In fact, the Ascended Masters are portrayed as cosmic fathers who will take care of their followers' problems. In contrast, Mahatma M. said: "We are leaders but not child-nurses."

MaitreyaMaitri is Sanskrit for "loving kindness." The historical Buddha was reported to have said near the time of his death in the 4th century BC that many Buddhas (awakened ones) had come before him, and that in the future another Buddha would come who would be greater than him, and who would embody "Maitri." This prophecy created the expectation of a Buddha Maitreya, which was probably fulfilled in the advent of the being now called "Jesus," likely Apollonius of Tyanna, who on his travels in India and the Far East was reported in many texts to have been called, "Issa," probably short for "Rishi" (great sage). His teachings embody that principle of loving kindness. Maitreya or Lord Maitreya is described in Theosophical literature of the late 19th-century and subsequent periods as an advanced spiritual entity and high-ranking member of a hidden Spiritual Hierarchy, the so-called Masters of the Ancient Wisdom. According to Theosophical doctrine, one of the Hierarchy's functions is to oversee the evolution of mankind; in accord with this function Maitreya is said to hold the so-called Office of the World Teacher. Theosophical texts posit that the purpose of this Office is to facilitate the transfer of knowledge about the true constitution and workings of Existence, thereby helping humanity in progression on a cyclical, but ever progressive, evolutionary path. This knowledge transfer is sometimes said to occur through Maitreya occasionally manifesting or incarnating in the physical realm, then assuming the role of World Teacher of Mankind.

The Theosophical concept of Maitreya has many similarities to the earlier Maitreya doctrine in Buddhism. However, they differ in important aspects, and developed differently. The Theosophical Maitreya has been assimilated or appropriated by a variety of quasi-theosophical and non-theosophical New Age and Esoteric groups and movements. These have added, and advanced, their own interpretations and commentary on the subject.

  Development of the concept 
The first mention of Maitreya in a Theosophical context occurs in the 1883 work Esoteric Buddhism by Alfred Percy Sinnett (1840–1921), an early Theosophical writer. The concepts described by Sinnett were amended, elaborated on, and greatly expanded in The Secret Doctrine, a book originally published 1888. The work was the magnum opus of Helena Blavatsky, one of the physical founders of the Theosophical Society and of contemporary Theosophy. In it, the messianic Maitreya is linked to both Buddhist and Hindu religious traditions. In the same work Blavatsky was to assert that there have been, and will be, multiple messianic (or messianic-like) instances in human history. These successive appearances of "emissarie of Truth" are according to the Blavatsky writings part of the unceasing oversight of Earth and of its inhabitants by a physically hidden Spiritual Hierarchy, called Masters of the Ancient Wisdom. The Theosophist, Alice Bailey, who broke with the Indian branch of the Theosophical Society, and who was heavily influenced by orthodox Christianity, started the expectation that the ""Maitreya" would actually be reborn on the earth  as a physical being, fulfilling the Christian ideal of a Second Coming, rather than the New Age ideal of the Christ being reborn in the heart of each individual.

Initiation

Initiation is a concept in Theosophy that there are nine levels of spiritual development that beings who live on Earth can progress upward through.  Within these levels, there are four basic levels of spiritual development that human beings on Earth progress through as they reincarnate, although evil acts may cause bad karma which may cause one to temporarily regress. It is believed that when souls have advanced to the fourth level of initiation, they have reached enlightenment and have no further need to reincarnate.  At the fifth level of initiation and beyond, souls  have the opportunity to become members of the Spiritual Hierarchy.  This concept was developed by both C.W. Leadbeater and Alice Bailey beginning in the 1920s.
  
According to C.W. Leadbeater, Initiation is a process by which "we try to develop ourselves not that we may become great and wise, but that we may have the power and knowledge to work for humanity to the best effect." According to Alice Bailey, Initiation is the "process of undergoing an expansion [toward higher levels] of consciousness" It is believed by Theosophists that all souls that have reached the fourth level of initiation and evolved beyond the necessity to reincarnate. Those who do not elect to become pratyeka buddhas and go directly into Spiritual Hierarchy governing nirvana, gradually evolving upward through all of these six higher levels of consciousness over thousands or millions of years, and later over billions or trillions of years, with other higher levels beyond.

The concept of Initiation is also recognized in the Ascended Master Teachings, a group of religions based on Theosophy. In the Ascended Master Teachings, the Sixth Initiation is referred to as Ascension. The first six initiations were named by Charles W. Leadbeater and Alice Bailey after the six most important events in the life of Jesus

The Ascension is believed to be the returning to complete "Oneness with God" - "raising the outer atomic structure of the physical, emotional, and mental bodies into the Electronic Structure of the I AM Consciousness", becoming an Ascended Master, eventually a Cosmic Being, and beyond. The Ascension into Immortality through reunion with the God Self requires the consuming of at least 51% of the records and memories of "negatively qualified karma" as well as:

 Mastery of the matter planes 
It is believed that the "Individualized Flames of Perfection", emanating as lifestreams taking physical embodiment, can develop further attributes that express a unique Identity, and attain the fullness of the use of Light. This is done by mastery over matter planes that have a slower vibratory action, thus requiring more energy and concentration to externalize form. This allows for the development of greater skills of creation and "Causal Body Momentums" of various "Divine Qualities". Physical embodiment gives each individual the opportunity to expand these attributes and faculties through matter substance, and to become a "master of energy" through thought and feeling. This allows for accomplishments and added power which one who does not ever embody on a planet does not possess. Thus an individual may expand the "Flame in the Heart", and expand the "Perfection of the Allness of God's Love" in the created universe, eventually becoming an Ascended Master and later a Cosmic Being.

According to the Ascended Master Teachings, gaining "mastery over matter planes" means learning to consciously use 100% of one's Creative Power of thought, feeling, and spoken word to create greater perfection, joy, and love in the world, as opposed to using thoughts, feelings, and words to create greater limitations, bondage, and chaos in one's own experience and in the world at large through carelessness and lack of awareness of the extent of one's influence in the world. "Matter planes" refers to the differentiations of atomic and molecular structure in which evolution takes place, the lower planes (dimensions / wavelength frequency resonance) sometimes correlated with physical solids, liquids, and gases; the higher subplanes of the Physical Octave are sometimes referred to as "etheric" and are not normally perceivable by the physical senses. The emotional and mental octaves are also made up of electrons and atoms of feeling and thought substance and differentiated into levels of density and vibratory rate."To understand the above explanation concerning the electron and the conscious control the individual has through his thought and feeling to govern the atomic structure of his own body is to understand the One Principle Governing form throughout Infinity. When man will make the effort to prove this to himself or within his own atomic flesh body, he will then proceed to Master Himself. When he has done that, all else in the Universe is his willing co-worker to accomplish whatsoever he wills through Love."

 Fulfillment of the Divine Plan 
"Within the Life of every human being is the Power by which he can express all that the Ascended Masters express every moment — if he but chooses to do so. All Life contains Will but only Self-Conscious Life is free to determine upon its own course of expression. Hence, the individual has free choice to express either in the human, limited body or the Super-Human, Divine Body. He is the chooser of his own field of expression. He is the Self-determining Creator. He has willed and chosen to live as Self-Conscious Life. . . . When one individualizes within the Absolute, All-Pervading Life he chooses of his own free will to become an intensified individual focus of Self-Conscious Intelligence. He is the conscious director of his future activities. Thus, having once made his choice, he is the only one who can fulfill that Destiny - which is not inflexible circumstance but a definitely designed Plan of Perfection.

 Periodization 

 The fall of man 
It is believed that since the "fall of man" during the time of the incarnation of the Fourth Root Race, imperfection, limitations and discord increasingly entered into our world. The memory body is considered to have become known as a "soul", and this temporary personality has taken on the sense of a self that is separated and not connected to God. It is believed that a "Dictation" from Maitreya further clarified this matter through the "Messenger", Geraldine Innocente, on September 27, 1954, when what occurred during the time of the "Fourth Root Race" was described:"Curiosity, rebellion against holding true to the Divine Pattern and the use of thought and feeling in creation of imperfection, began the building of what you call the 'soul'. It is a consciousness apart from the full Purity of God. The first thought a man had that was imperfect and impure, energized by a secret feeling, was a cause and that, sent out into the atmosphere, created an effect. Like a boomerang, the effect came back into the consciousness and made a record. That record was the beginning of an impression. Energy sent out in a certain manner returned to affect the lifestream who had sent it forth and there began to be created a shadow between the I AM Presence and the human consciousness. Endeavoring to contact the Presence, the individual would find these 'tramp' thoughts and feelings flowing through that line of contact until more and more imperfect was the conscious use of them. Finally, those centers got completely away from the control of the ego and acted independently.

 Dawning Golden Age 
Students of the Ascended Master Teachings believe that this world is destined to again have a Golden Age, a "Heaven on Earth", that will be permanent, unlike previous Golden Ages millions of years ago."In your beloved America, in the not so far distant future, will come forth a similar recognition of the Real Inner Self, and this her people will express in high attainment. She is a Land of Light, and Her Light shall blaze forth, brilliant as the sun at noonday, among the nations of the Earth. She was a Land of Great Light, ages ago, and will again come into her spiritual heritage, for nothing can prevent it."

"The Divine Plan for the future of North America is a condition of intense activity in the greatest peace, beauty, success, prosperity, spiritual illumination, and dominion. She is to carry the Christ Light and be the Guide for the rest of the Earth, because America is to be the Heart Center of the 'Golden Age' that is now dimly touching our horizon. The greater portion of the land of North America will stand for a very long time."

The Great White Brotherhood
The Great White Brotherhood, in belief systems akin to Theosophical and New Age, are said to be supernatural beings of great power who spread spiritual teachings through selected humans. The members of the Brotherhood may be known as the Masters of the Ancient Wisdom or the Ascended masters. Various people have said they have received messages from these beings, including most notably Helena Blavatsky (Theosophy), Aleister Crowley (Thelema), Alice Bailey (New Group of World Servers), Guy Ballard ("I AM" Activity), Geraldine Innocente (The Bridge to Freedom), Mark L. Prophet & Elizabeth Clare Prophet (Church Universal and Triumphant) and Benjamin Creme (Share International).

The Masters are collectively called the "Great White Brotherhood" by various theosophists and esotericists. The use of the term "white" refers to their advanced spirituality (in other words, that they have a white colored 
aura) and has nothing to do with race. Blavatsky described many of the Masters as ethnically Tibetan or Indian (Hindu), not European. She did, however, describe them as being from all cultures and races, such as the "Greek gentleman" known as Hilarion.

Belief in the Brotherhood and the Masters is an essential part of the syncretistic teachings of various organizations that have taken the Theosophical philosophical concepts and added their own elements. Examples of those believed to be Ascended Masters by these organizations are: Jesus, Sanat Kumara, Gautama Buddha, Maitreya, Confucius, Lord Lanto (Confucius' historical mentor), Mary (mother of Jesus), Lady Master Nada, Enoch, Kwan Yin, Saint Germain, and Koot Hoomi (Kuthumi), to name but a few. It is believed that all of these put aside any differences they might have had in their Earthly careers, and unite instead to advance the spiritual well-being of humanity.

Dictations
Within "The I AM Activity" (founded by Guy Ballard in the early 1930s), claimed contact and cooperation with the Ascended Masters became a central part of each member's life. Through the Ballards as "Messengers", the Ascended Masters were believed to have regularly communicated with the students of "The I AM Activity." Those supposed Addresses (known as "Dictations") were delivered before gatherings of members in Conclaves held throughout the United States of America, and published in the monthly periodical The Voice of The "I AM", and some were collected and reprinted in the "green books" of The Saint Germain Series. In all, 3,834 claimed Dictations from the Masters were received through Guy and Edna Ballard. Other "Ascended Master Activities" believed that the Ascended Masters, Cosmic Beings, Elohim, and Archangels continued to present a program for both individual development and spiritual transformation in the world. They believe that further instruction from the Ascended Masters and the rest of the Spiritual Hierarchy continued through new Dispensations with new Messengers, such as The Bridge to Freedom, The Summit Lighthouse, and The Temple of The Presence.

The Aquarian Church
The Aquarian Christine Church Universal, Inc. (ACCU) is a denomination founded in 2006 based on The Aquarian Gospel of Jesus the Christ said to be transcribed from the Akashic Records by Levi H. Dowling. The Aquarian Christine Church actively promotes Ascended Master Teachings and shares many beliefs in common with the I AM Movement, White Eagle Lodge and New Thought and Theosophical groups.  The book "Initiations of the Aquarian Masters: The Theosophy of the Aquarian Gospel" by ACCU founder Jacob L. Watson, expounds on the church's teachings which draw heavily from the writings of A.D.K. Luk (pen-name of Alice Beulah  Schutz) (April 10, 1905 - Jan. 14, 1994), the Saint Germain Series published by the Saint Germain Press (The Saint Germain Foundation), and especially from "The Lost Years of Jesus" compiled by Elizabeth Clare Prophet and published by The Summit Lighthouse.

Skeptical views
René Guénon wrote a detailed critique of Theosophy titled Theosophy: history of a pseudo-religion (1921). In the book Guenon speculated that Blavatsky had acquired all her knowledge naturally from other books not from any supernatural masters. Guenon points out that Blavatsky spent a long time visiting a library at New York where she had easy access to the works of Jacob Boehme, Eliphas Levi, the Kabbala and other Hermetic treatises. Guenon also speculated that Blavatsky had borrowed passages from extracts of the Kanjur and Tanjur, translated by the eccentric orientalist Sándor Kőrösi Csoma, published in 1836 in the twentieth volume of the Asiatic Researchers of Calcutta.

K. Paul Johnson suggests in his book The Masters Revealed: Madam Blavatsky and Myth of the Great White Brotherhood that the Masters that Madam Blavatsky claimed she had personally met are idealizations of certain people she had met during her lifetime.

Also see the article “Talking to the Dead and Other Amusements” by Paul Zweig, New York Times October 5, 1980, which speculates that Madame Blavatsky's revelations were fraudulent.

Robert Todd Carroll in his book The skeptic's dictionary (2003) speculates that Blavatsky used trickery into deceiving others into thinking she had paranormal powers. Carroll further speculates that Blavatsky had faked a materialization of a tea cup and saucer as well as written the messages from her masters herself.

See also

 Abdal
 Ancients (Stargate)
 Avatar
 Hodgson Report
 K.H. Letters to C.W. Leadbeater Khidr 
 Khwajagan
 Master Morya
 Mysticism
 Once-returner
 The Perennial Philosophy Qutb
 Satguru
 Sarmoung
 Secret Chiefs
 Shambhala
 Shangri-La
 Xian

Notes

References
 Braden, Charles S. These Also Believe MacMillan Publishing Company 1960 (Reprint 2000). The classic study of minority religions in the United States of America. 
 Cranston, Sylvia. H. P. B. : The Extraordinary Life & Influence of Helena Blavastsky . G. P. Putnam's Sons 1993  
 Godwin, Joscelyn (1994). The Theosophical Enlightenment. SUNY Press.  
 King, Godfre Ray. Unveiled Mysteries. Saint Germain Press 1934. 
 King, Godfre Ray. The Magic Presence. Saint Germain Press 1935. 
 Luk, A.D.K.. Law of Life - Books I & II. Pueblo, Colorado: A.D.K. Luk Publications 1989, Summary of Ascended Master Teachings from 1934 - 1958 as released through The I AM Activity and The Bridge to Freedom.
 Milanovich, Norma & Shirley McCune. The Light Shall Set You Free. Athena Publishing 1996, 2004.  Includes "quotes" from numerous Ascended Masters
 Leadbeater, C.W. The Masters and the Path . The Theosophical Publishing House 1925 (Reprint: Kessinger Publishing 1997). 
 Hall, Manly P. The Secret Teachings of All Ages "An Encyclopedic Outline of Masonic, Hermetic, Qabbalistic and Rosicrucian Symbolical Philosophy Being an Interpretation of the Secret Teachings Concealed within the Rituals, Allegories and Mysteries of all Ages" H.S. Crocker Company, Inc. 1928 (Reprint: Tarcher 2003) 
 Partridge, Christopher ed. New Religions: A Guide: New Religious Movements, Sects and Alternative Spiritualities Oxford University Press, USA 2004. Describes The I AM Activity, The Bridge to Freedom and The Summit Lighthouse. 
 Partridge, Christopher ed. New Religions: A Guide: New Religious Movements, Sects and Alternative Spiritualities Oxford University Press, USA 2004. Describes the Theosophical Society, The I AM Activity, The Bridge to Freedom and The Summit Lighthouse. 
 Saint Germain Foundation. The History of the "I AM" Activity and Saint Germain Foundation . Saint Germain Press 2003  
 Saint Germain. I AM Discourses . Saint Germain Press 1935.  
 Mt. Shasta, Peter. Apprentice to the Masters: Adventures of Western Mystic, Book II 

 Further reading 
 Campbell, Bruce F. Ancient Wisdom Revived: A History of the Theosophical Movement Berkeley: 1980 University of California Press 
 Johnson, K. Paul The Masters Revealed: Madam Blavatsky and Myth of the Great White Brotherhood Albany, New York: 1994 State University of New York Press 
 Melton, J. Gordon Encyclopedia of American Religions 5th Edition New York:1996 Gale Research  ISSN 1066-1212
Chapter 18--"The Ancient Wisdom Family of Religions" Pages 151–158; see chart on page 154 listing Masters of the Ancient Wisdom;
Section 18, Pages 717-757 Descriptions of various Ancient Wisdom religious organizations
 Melton, Gordon American Religious Creeds (Detroit: Gale, 1988; republished in three volumes, New York: Triumph Books, 1991) See chapter on the Ancient Wisdom'' group of religions.

External links 
 Ageless Wisdom Teachings
 The Saint Germain Foundation , Original publisher of Ascended Master Teachings beginning in 1934

Ascended Master Teachings
Entering heaven alive
Esoteric cosmology
Masters of the Ancient Wisdom
Spiritual evolution
Theosophical philosophical concepts
Theosophy